

177001–177100 

|-id=065
| 177065 Samuelnoah ||  || Twins Samuel Rodriguez (born 2019) and Noah Rodriguez (born 2019) are great-grandchildren of James Whitney Young, who discovered this minor planet. || 
|}

177101–177200 

|-id=120
| 177120 Ocampo Uría ||  || Adriana Ocampo (born 1955) was the NASA Headquarters Program Program Executive for the New Horizons mission to Pluto. || 
|-id=148
| 177148 Pätzold ||  || Martin Pätzold (born 1960), Max Planck Institute, worked as a Science Team Collaborator for radio science for the New Horizons mission to Pluto. || 
|}

177201–177300 

|-bgcolor=#f2f2f2
| colspan=4 align=center | 
|}

177301–177400 

|-bgcolor=#f2f2f2
| colspan=4 align=center | 
|}

177401–177500 

|-id=415
| 177415 Queloz ||  || Didier Queloz (born 1966), Swiss astrophysicist at Geneva University known for the discovery of 51 Pegasi b, the first extrasolar planet around a main-sequence start || 
|}

177501–177600 

|-bgcolor=#f2f2f2
| colspan=4 align=center | 
|}

177601–177700 

|-id=625
| 177625 Dembicky || 2004 JD || Jack M. Dembicky (born 1966) was the telescope operations specialist, and is now the support astronomer at New Mexico's Apache Point Observatory. He was the lead 2MASS telescope operator at the F. L. Whipple Observatory at Mount Hopkins, AZ (1997–2000). He has an M.S. in Physics (1996) from Wichita State University. || 
|-id=659
| 177659 Paolacel ||  || Paola Celletti (born 1956), Italian architect from the University of Rome "La Sapienza". She has been an amateur astronomer and involved in public outreach. || 
|}

177701–177800 

|-id=722
| 177722 Pelletier ||  || Frederic J. Pelletier (born 1974), a senior engineer at KinetX, who worked as Navigation Lead for the New Horizons mission to Pluto || 
|-id=770
| 177770 Saulanwu ||  || Sau Lan Wu (b. 1940s) is a Chinese-American particle physicist. She is renowned for her integral leadership and participation in the discoveries of the charm quark, the [gluon], and the Higgs boson. Wu is the Enrico Fermi Distinguished Professor of Physics at the University of Wisconsin, Madison, and an experimentalist at CERN. || 
|}

177801–177900 

|-id=853
| 177853 Lumezzane ||  || Lumezzane, a small town in northern Italy, near Brescia || 
|}

177901–178000 

|-id=967
| 177967 Chouchihkang ||  || Chih-Kang Chou (born 1935), a Chinese-born astronomer, who taught and conducted research in astronomy at the National Central University in Taiwan for 30 years. || 
|-id=982
| 177982 Popilnia ||  || Popilnia Raion, a district of Zhytomyr Oblast, located in northwestern Ukrainian, and motherland of poet Maksym Rylsky || 
|}

References 

177001-178000